Vingtaine du Coin is one of the four vingtaines of St. Brélade Parish on the Channel Island of Jersey.

Together with Vingtaine de Noirmont, it forms "St.Brélade No. 1 district" and elects one Deputy.

Saint Brélade
Coin
Jersey articles needing attention